High Profits is an eight-part CNN documentary television series about Breckenridge Cannabis Club and the U.S. state of Colorado's legal cannabis industry. The series began airing on April 19, 2015.

References

External links
 
 

2015 in American television
Cannabis in Colorado
American television series about cannabis